The RTAF-5 was a Thai training and forward air control aircraft developed and built by the Science and Weapon Systems Development Centre of the Royal Thai Air Force in the 1980s.  It was a twin-boom configuration aircraft powered by a single pusher turboprop engine, but only a single example was built.

Development and design
In 1976, the Science and Weapon Systems Development Centre of the Royal Thai Air Force, based at Don Muang Air Base, Bangkok, started development of a trainer/forward air control aircraft, the RTAF-5. It was a single-engined high-wing monoplane of all-metal construction with twin booms, and with a fuselage resembling that of an OV-10 Bronco, but powered by a single Allison 250 turboprop engine at the rear of the fuselage. It had a retractable nosewheel undercarriage and had four underwing hardpoints, with wingtip fuel tanks.

The prototype first flew on 5 October 1984, with the undercarriage fixed for early testing. Development was delayed by the license production of RFB Fantrainers by the RTAF, and was eventually abandoned, only the single prototype (which is preserved at the Royal Thai Air Force Museum) being flown, with a second example being used for static testing.

Specifications

References
Notes

Bibliography

 "Airdata File" Air International, February 1986, Vol 30 No 2. p. 103. ISSN 0306-5634.

External links

Aircraft manufactured in Thailand
Cancelled military aircraft projects
Royal Thai Air Force
1980s Thai military trainer aircraft
Twin-boom aircraft
Single-engined turboprop aircraft
Single-engined pusher aircraft
Mid-wing aircraft
Aircraft first flown in 1984